Later Liao was a short-lived dynastic regime in Northeast China that existed between 1216 and 1219. It was ruled by the House of Yelü and was the last regime that sought to revive the Liao dynasty in China (the Eastern Liao had by this time become a vassal of the Mongol Empire).

History
In 1213, Yelü Liuge proclaimed the Eastern Liao after rebelling against the Jin dynasty. His pro-Mongol policy caused a split within the Eastern Liao court, eventually resulting in Yelü Sibu (the younger brother of Yelü Liuge) declaring himself emperor of an independent regime with the official dynastic title "Liao", known in retrospect as "Later Liao". Not long after proclaiming himself emperor, Yelü Sibu was killed. The premier Yelü Qinu was made regent.

After suffering military defeat by the Jin dynasty, Yelü Qinu escaped and was subsequently killed by Yelü Jinshan. Yelü Jinshan ascended to the Later Liao throne in Goryeo. In 1217, Goryeo forces defeated Yelü Jinshan and forced him to abscond.

Yelü Jinshan's successor, Yelü Tong'guyu, was killed by Yelü Hanshe not long after becoming the ruler of Later Liao. As infighting erupted within Later Liao, an allied forces of Eastern Liao, the Mongol Empire and Goryeo encircled Later Liao. In 1219, Yelü Hanshe committed suicide in the aftermath of Later Liao's defeat, marking the end of the short-lived dynasty. The territories once held by Later Liao were re-incorporated into Eastern Liao.

Monarchs
The only Later Liao monarch to use the title of emperor was Yelü Sibu. All subsequent rulers assumed the title of king.

References

Dynasties in Chinese history
Former countries in Chinese history
Khitan history